The Green-Eyed Devil is a 1914 American short silent film directed by James Kirkwood. The film starred Earle Foxe, Spottiswoode Aitken and William Garwood in the lead roles.

The film was written by Daniel Carson Goodman (story) and George Pattullo (writer) (scenario).

Cast 
 Spottiswoode Aitken   
 Earle Foxe  
 William Garwood   
 Lillian Gish   
 Elaine Ivans 
 George Siegmann   
 Ralph Spears
 Henry B. Walthall

See also
 List of American films of 1914
 Lillian Gish filmography

References

External links

1914 films
American silent short films
American black-and-white films
Films directed by James Kirkwood Sr.
1910s American films